Andreea Laiu (born 15 March 1986) is a Romanian football midfielder or striker who plays for Kiryat Gat. She previously played for Apollon Limassol of Cyprus' First Division.

For ten years she was a member of the Romania national team, but was not called up after 2014.

References

External links

Profile at Israel Football Association

1986 births
Living people
Romanian women's footballers
Romania women's international footballers
Expatriate women's footballers in Cyprus
Expatriate women's footballers in Norway
Expatriate women's footballers in Russia
Expatriate women's footballers in Iceland
Expatriate women's footballers in Israel
Apollon Ladies F.C. players
Amazon Grimstad players
Toppserien players
WFC Rossiyanka players
F.C. Kiryat Gat (women) players
Women's association football forwards
Romanian expatriate sportspeople in Cyprus
Romanian expatriate sportspeople in Norway
Romanian expatriate sportspeople in Russia
Romanian expatriate sportspeople in Iceland
Romanian expatriate sportspeople in Israel
CFF Clujana players